The Heavitree Gap, or Ntaripe in the Arrernte language, is a water gap in the Northern Territory of Australia in the MacDonnell Ranges. It is the southern entrance to the city of Alice Springs and in addition to the Todd River it carries the main road and rail access to the south.

The Gap is an important sacred site for the Arrernte people and its use as a thoroughfare was avoided by women prior to the construction of the road and later Central Australia Railway.

The Gap was named by William Mills, the Overland Telegraph line surveyor who discovered the location for Alice Springs.  It was named after his former school in Heavitree, Devon.

On the southwest side of The Gap is the historic Heavitree Gap Police Station.

The Gap has been painted by numerous artists including Albert Namatjira, Oscar Namatjira, Basel Rangea, and John Borrack.

References

External links
1923 photograph of Heavitree Gap

Heavitree Gap, watercolour painting by Albert Namatjira

Alice Springs
Canyons and gorges in the Northern Territory
Water gaps
Valleys of Australia